The Advance was an English tricar producing 6 hp (4.5 kW) offered from 1902 to 1912 by a Northampton motorcycle manufacturer.

See also 
 List of car manufacturers of the United Kingdom

External links
 History of Advance cars

Defunct motor vehicle manufacturers of England
History of Northampton
Cars of England